"Deuces" is a song written and performed by American singer Chris Brown featuring fellow American musicians Tyga and Kevin McCall. Produced by McCall, "Deuces" was released digitally on June 25, 2010, as the lead single from Brown's first collaborative effort with Tyga, titled Fan of a Fan (2010). The song is a slow, down-tempo R&B ballad featuring elements from the genres of house and pop music, while the song is lyrically about "breaking it off with a girl after failed attempts to make the relationship work". "Deuces" was later included on Brown's fourth studio album, F.A.M.E. (2011).

Following its release, 
some critics speculated that the lyrics of the song were about Brown's former relationship with Barbadian singer Rihanna. "Deuces" earned Brown two award nominations for Best Rap/Sung Collaboration at the 53rd Grammy Awards and Best Collaboration at the 2011 BET Awards. The song was a commercial success in the United States, reaching number 14 on the Billboard Hot 100 and number one on the Hot R&B/Hip-Hop Songs chart, becoming Brown's first number-one single on the chart since "Say Goodbye" (2006). Additionally, it peaked inside the top 30 in New Zealand and the top-seventy in the United Kingdom.

The accompanying music video was directed by Colin Tilley and shot in black and white at the Los Angeles River. Brown performed "Deuces" live on the television show 106 & Park, during his F.A.M.E. Tour (2011), and at Supafest (2012) in Australia.

Background and composition 
"Deuces" was written by Chris Brown, Michael "Tyga" Stevenson and Kevin McCall, who also produced the track. Vocals were recorded by Michael Congdon at the In Your Ear Studios in Richmond, Virginia, with assistance by Dustin Faltz. The recordings were later mixed by Brian Springer at The Record Plant in Los Angeles, California, with assistance by Anthony Taglianett. "Deuces" leaked online on May 20, 2010, and was later released digitally on June 25, 2010 as the first single from Brown's collaborative mixtape with Tyga, Fan of a Fan (2010). In an interview with MTV News, Tyga elaborated on "Deuces" and its theme, stating: "Basically it's about you getting rid of this girl, you tried to make it work, but you got to move on. So you put up one finger, put up another, and then 'Deuces. The song appeared as the opening track on Brown's fourth studio album, F.A.M.E. (2011).

Musically, "Deuces" is a slow, down-tempo R&B ballad that displays elements of house and pop music. The song has a length of four minutes and thirty-six seconds. It is backed by synth chords and "eerie harmonies", with Brown's "smooth vocals" making use of auto-tune effects. According to Sara D. Anderson of AOL Radio, the song contains lyrical content about "breaking it off with a girl after failed attempts to make the relationship work". In the first verse, Brown sings: "All that bullshit is for the birds, you ain't nothing but a vulture / Always hoping for the worst, waiting for me to fuck up / You'll regret the day when I find another girl, that knows just what I need / She knows just what I mean."

Music video 
The accompanying music videos for "Deuces" and "No Bullshit" premiered simultaneously online on May 24, 2010, and both were directed by Colin Tilley. The video was shot in black-and-white, and is set at the Los Angeles River. It begins with a woman walking down the river's culvert. As the song begins, Brown, wearing a dark sleeveless jacket, sunglasses, and light-colored pants, sings his verse while standing against a car with Tyga and Kevin McCall. This scene is intercut with scenes of Brown singing alone at the culvert, wearing a hooded jumper and skinny jeans. During the chorus, Brown is seen dancing in a tunnel. As Tyga raps his verse, he is sitting on a graffitied concrete barrier, while Brown appears in the background. This scene is intercut with scenes of Tyga, Brown and McCall walking down a street with a lowrider driving slowly behind them. As the second chorus begins, earlier scenes from the video are intercut with each other. McCall then begins to rap his verse while leaning against a wall, which is then intercut with scenes of him rapping from previous settings of the video. During the final chorus of the song, more scenes of Brown dancing in the tunnel are shown.

Live performances 

On May 15, 2010, Brown performed "Deuces" with Tyga at the "Virginia Stand Up! A Call to Action" benefit concert as part of a set list, which included "Say Goodbye", "Yo (Excuse Me Miss)", "Gimme That", "Kiss Kiss", "Take You Down" and "Forever". The concert was organized by Brown to help with continued relief efforts in Haiti following the January 2010 earthquake. Jayson Rodriguez of MTV News wrote that "the superstar singer couldn't have been more giving, doing his best to please the packed house". On December 3, 2010, Brown, wearing a charcoal grey suit with Adidas sneakers, performed the song with Tyga and Kevin McCall as part of his set list at the Cali Christmas concert. In March 2011, Brown and Tyga performed "Deuces" on the television music show, 106 & Park. "Deuces" was also added to the set list of Brown's F.A.M.E. Tour. In his review of the tour, Jeremy Trucker of The Baltimore Sun criticized Brown for lip syncing his performances, and remained unconvinced that Brown's "talent was special enough to warrant his continued, well, fame". In April 2012, Brown performed "Deuces" at the Supafest tour in Australia as part of a set list, which included "Run It!", "Yeah 3x", "Look at Me Now", "She Ain't You", "Wet the Bed" and "Turn Up the Music", among others. A reviewer for Rap-Up magazine praised his set, writing "A tatted Chris Brown thrilled with his chart-topping hits".

Critical reception

"Deuces" received mixed reviews. Joanne Dorken of MTV UK wrote that the song was "a good platform for Brown to show off his silky-smooth vocals". Hannah Ash of The Harber Herald called it "a great rap track" with "fantastic beats". In an album review for F.A.M.E., Mark Edward Nero of About.com wrote that "Deuces" was one of "the album's best material". A reviewer for Girlfriend magazine wrote that "Deuces" along with "Yeah 3x" and "Beautiful People", were the most "worth listening to" of the album. Mesfin Fekadu of the Associated Press labeled "Deuces" as one of the "best songs" of 2010, while August Brown of Los Angeles Times called it his "favorite single" of 2010. According to Steve Jones of USA Today, the song shows that "Brown is taking it to the next phase". Sean Fennessey of The Washington Post characterised "Deuces" as "the effervescent kiss-off" track. Shahryar Rizvi of Dallas Observer was critical of the song, writing that it "sounds minimally produced and quiet. As a result, it sounds kind of boring".

Critics also speculated that the lyrics of the song were about Brown's former relationship with pop singer Rihanna. Becky Bain of Idolator described "Deuces" as a "bitter woman-hating track" that could be "about Rihanna or just females in general", and wrote that "as damning as some of the lyrics are, this emotional jam is actually a step in the right direction for Brown". Anthony Benigno of The Faster Times observed that the song could be a reference to "the Rihanna incident", writing "is it about RiRi? Maybe, maybe not. He ain't telling, in any case". Jayson Rodriguez of MTV News wrote that "Deuces" was indeed a "standout" track from the Fan of a Fan mixtape, and that it "appears to be a dig at Rihanna". The song was nominated for Best Rap/Sung Collaboration at the 53rd Grammy Awards, and Best Collaboration at the 2011 BET Awards.

Remixes
In September 2010, during a Ustream session with fans, Brown announced plans of releasing an "all-star" remix to "Deuces", which would feature rappers Drake, T.I., Kanye West, Fabolous, Rick Ross, and André 3000." The remix appeared online on October 1, 2010, and was released as a digital EP on November 2, 2010. A day after the "all-star" remix premiered online, American R&B singer Ciara released her own remix of the song, which was supposed to be included on her Basic Instinct mixtape. American R&B singer Teairra Marí also recorded her own remix of "Deuces" for her mixtape, The Night Before X-Mas (2010).

Chart performance
In the United States, "Deuces" debuted on the Hot R&B/Hip-Hop Songs chart at number 72 on the issue dated July 17, 2010. It peaked at number one in its ninth week on the chart, becoming Brown's first number-one single on the chart since "Say Goodbye" (2006). "Deuces" was tied with Monica's single "Everything to Me" (2010), for both being the fastest songs in 2010 to climb to the number one spot in nine weeks. "Deuces" peaked at number 14 on the Billboard Hot 100 and spent 19 weeks on the chart. On the New Zealand Singles Chart, "Deuces" debuted and peaked at number 23 on July 26, 2010. It spent six weeks on the chart. In the United Kingdom, "Deuces" debuted and peaked at number 68 on November 20, 2010, and appeared on the chart for one week. It also charted on the UK R&B Singles Chart at number fourteen.

Track listing 
Digital download
"Deuces" (featuring Tyga and Kevin McCall) – 4:36
"No Bullshit" – 4:07

Digital Remix EP
"Deuces" (featuring Drake and Kanye West) – 4:34
"Deuces" (featuring T.I. and Rick Ross) – 3:42
"Deuces" (featuring Fabolous and André 3000) – 4:34
"Deuces" (featuring Drake, Kanye West and André 3000) – 5:38
"Deuces" (featuring Drake, T.I., Kanye West, Fabolous, Rick Ross and André 3000) – 6:43

Credits and personnel 
Chris Brown – lead vocals
Kevin McCall – songwriter, producer, featured vocals
Brian Springer – audio mixing
Anthony Taglianett – assistant audio mixing
Michael Stevenson – songwriter, featured vocals

Credits adapted from the liner notes for F.A.M.E.

Charts

Weekly charts

Year-end charts

Decade-end charts

Certifications

Release history

See also 
List of number-one R&B singles of 2010 (U.S.)

References 

2010s ballads
2010 singles
Chris Brown songs
Tyga songs
Kevin McCall songs
Contemporary R&B ballads
Music videos directed by Colin Tilley
Black-and-white music videos
2010 songs
Songs written by Chris Brown
Songs written by Tyga
Jive Records singles
Songs written by Kevin McCall